Aaron Wan-Bissaka (born 26 November 1997) is an English professional footballer who plays as a right-back for  club Manchester United.

Wan-Bissaka began his career with Crystal Palace and was named as the club's Player of the Year for the 2018–19 season. In 2019, he moved to Manchester United for an initial fee of £45 million, with another £5 million due in potential bonuses.

He is of Congolese descent and made one appearance for DR Congo under-20s in 2015. He has gone on to represent the country of his birth, England, at under-20 and under-21 levels.

Early life
Wan-Bissaka was born in Croydon, Greater London and grew up in New Addington, Croydon, where he attended Good Shepherd Catholic Primary School.

Club career

Crystal Palace

Wan-Bissaka was a member of the Crystal Palace academy from the age of 11, where he started out as a winger. He signed a professional contract with the club in December 2016.

On the 2017 pre-season tour, Wan-Bissaka began to feature with the Palace first team under new manager Frank de Boer, playing in a number of friendlies. The Dutchman played a formation with wing-backs, and this new role emphasised Wan-Bissaka's defensive capabilities, eventually leading to him moving from a winger to a full-back. However, he saw chances limited in the first half of the season as De Boer showed a preference to play Timothy Fosu-Mensah or Martin Kelly at right-back, then new manager Roy Hodgson favoured Joel Ward. He was an unused substitute a few times under the new manager, while also starring for the Eagles U23 side.

On 25 February 2018, Wan-Bissaka made his first-team debut for Crystal Palace, in the midst of an injury crisis, in a Premier League match against Tottenham Hotspur at Selhurst Park which resulted in a 1–0 defeat. He played all but two minutes of the four Palace matches in March, and won the club's Player of the Month award with 65% of the supporters' votes.

On 20 August 2018, Wan-Bissaka was sent off in a 2–0 loss to Liverpool for denying Mohamed Salah a clear goalscoring opportunity. He was named the club's Player of the Month for August, September, October and March. On 30 April 2019, Wan-Bissaka was named the Crystal Palace Player of the Year for his displays throughout the season.

Manchester United
On 29 June 2019, Wan-Bissaka signed a five-year contract with fellow Premier League club Manchester United. Crystal Palace would receive an initial fee of £45 million, with another £5 million due in potential bonuses. Upon signing for Manchester United, Wan-Bissaka became the sixth-most expensive defender of all time and the most expensive English player who was uncapped by the national side at the time of transfer.

On 11 August 2019, he made his Manchester United debut, playing the full 90 minutes in a 4–0 league victory over Chelsea. At the end of his first season at Manchester United, he made the highest number of tackles in the 2019–20 Premier League season. On 17 October 2020, as United won 4–1 at Newcastle United, he scored the first goal of his professional career. On 2 February 2021, Wan-Bissaka scored the opening goal in United's Premier League record-equalling 9–0 win over Southampton.

International career
Wan-Bissaka was born in England and is of Congolese descent. Wan-Bissaka made a single appearance for DR Congo U20s in an 8–0 friendly loss to the England U17s on 7 October 2015. However, he remained eligible to represent the country of his birth and, after impressing for Crystal Palace, Wan-Bissaka was called up to the England under-20 squad in March 2018. He was sent off during his debut against Poland, although England still won 1–0.

Wan-Bissaka was called up to the England U21 squad for the first time in September 2018 and made his debut for them on 6 September, playing 90 minutes in a 0–0 draw with the Netherlands at Carrow Road. On 27 May 2019, Wan-Bissaka was included in England's 23-man squad for the 2019 UEFA European Under-21 Championship. He made one appearance in the tournament, a 2–1 loss against France, in which he scored an own goal.

Despite interest from DR Congo, Wan-Bissaka said in May 2019 that he intended to pursue an international career with England, stating: "The aim is England. I am happy playing with England and representing England, so that is what I am going to continue doing".

In August 2019, Wan-Bissaka received his first call-up to the senior England team, ahead of UEFA Euro 2020 qualifiers against Kosovo and Bulgaria, but was forced to withdraw from the squad due to a back injury.

Since the injury withdrawal in 2019, Aaron Wan-Bissaka has found himself competing with the likes of Kyle Walker, Trent Alexander-Arnold, Kieran Trippier and Reece James, as for the result of his faltering performance, he has several times expressed his desire to represent his ancestral DR Congo, and media speculation has also supported the claim of his potential nationality switch, even though he has not done so by 2022.

Style of play
Wan-Bissaka is primarily a defensively minded right-back, known for his pace, slide tackling and ability in one-on-one defensive duels. He was described as the "best one-on-one defender for a full-back in the world" by Jamie Carragher in 2020. In the 2019–20 Premier League season Wan-Bissaka made the joint-highest number of tackles, level with Wilfred Ndidi on 129.

Personal life
In December 2021, Wan-Bissaka was given a six-month driving ban and a £31,500 fine by Leeds Magistrates Court for driving while disqualified and uninsured, and for not giving driver details about two speeding offences. His lawyers said that he was unaware of his offending, as he had not registered his new address with the DVLA.

Career statistics

Honours
Manchester United
EFL Cup: 2022–23
UEFA Europa League runner-up: 2020–21

Individual
Crystal Palace Young Player of the Year: 2017–18
Crystal Palace Player of the Year: 2018–19
UEFA Europa League Squad of the Season: 2020–21

References

External links

Profile at the Manchester United F.C. website

1997 births
Living people
Footballers from Croydon
Democratic Republic of the Congo footballers
Democratic Republic of the Congo under-20 international footballers
English footballers
England youth international footballers
England under-21 international footballers
Association football defenders
Crystal Palace F.C. players
Manchester United F.C. players
Premier League players
English sportspeople of Democratic Republic of the Congo descent
Black British sportsmen